The 2007–08 Campionato Sammarinese di Calcio season was the twenty-third since its establishment. The regular season started on September 21, 2007 and ended on April 20, 2008. The playoff competition, in which the top three clubs from each girone competed for the national title and qualification for the first qualifying round of the UEFA Champions League next season, started on May 7, 2008 and ended with the final on June 3, 2008. S.S. Murata successfully defended their title for the second time, winning their third straight national title, and winning qualification, beating out Juvenes/Dogana in the final.

2007–08 teams

Girone A (8 teams) 
 S.P. Cailungo (Borgo Maggiore)
 F.C. Domagnano (Domagnano)
 S.S. Folgore/Falciano (Serravalle)
 F.C. Fiorentino (Fiorentino)
 A.C. Juvenes/Dogana (Serravalle)
 S.S. Pennarossa (Chiesanuova)
 S.P. Tre Fiori (Fiorentino)
 S.P. Tre Penne (Serravalle)

Girone B (7 teams)
 S.S. Cosmos (Serravalle)
 S.C. Faetano (Faetano)
 S.P. La Fiorita (Montegiardino)
 A.C. Libertas (Borgo Maggiore)
 S.S. Murata (San Marino)
 S.S. San Giovanni (Borgo Maggiore)
 S.S. Virtus (Acquaviva)

Regular season

Group A

Group B

Results
All teams play twice against the teams within their own group and once against the teams from the other group.

Play-off

First round
The second place club will play the third place club from the opposite girone.

|}

Second round
The first round winners play the first place clubs from each girone.

|}

Third round
The losers from the first and second round play each other. The losers from this round are eliminated.

|}

Fourth round
The second round winners play each other. The winner advances to the finals and loser moves to the semifinals.

|}

The third round winners play each other and the loser is eliminated.

|}

Semifinal
The winner advances to the finals and the loser is eliminated.

|}

Final

Top goalscorers
Updated to games played April 20, 2008.

Girone A
 16 goals
  Marco Fantini (Juvenes/Dogana)

 14 goals
  Stefano Bullini (Tre Penne)

 13 goals
  Alessandro Giunta (Tre Fiori)

 11 goals
  Marco Casadei (Tre Penne)
  Alberto Celli (Domagnano)

 10 goals
  Simone Amadori (Tre Penne)
  Alessandro Pancotti (Pennarossa)

9 goals
  Francesco Rossi (Cailungo)

8 goals
  Fabio Felici (Domagnano)
  Steven Venerucci (Fiorentino)
  Giacomo Gamberini (Juvenes/Dogana)
  Lorenzo Boschi (Cailungo)

Girone B
21 goals
  Mohammed Zaboul (Murata)

17 goals
  Alex Olivieri (Faetano)

 16 goals
  Simon Parma (La Fiorita)

 12 goals
  Fabio Algeri (Libertas)

 10 goals
  Filippi Fabbri (Virtus)

 9 goals
  Domenico Di Paolo (San Giovanni)

 8 goals
  Andrea Bartoli (Virtus)
  Ridvan Frani (Virtus)
  Roberto Gatti (La Fiorita)
  Paolo Montagna (Cosmos)

7 goals
  Octavio Folli (Faetano)
  Maurizio Di Giulu (Murata)

References 

Campionato Sammarinese di Calcio
San Marino
1